Peace Is the Mission is the third studio album by American electronic dance music project Major Lazer. It was released on June 1, 2015. The album was preceded by the international hit single "Lean On" featuring DJ Snake and MØ. The single reached number one in Australia, New Zealand, Belgium, Denmark, Finland and the Netherlands and peaked within the top ten in an additional fourteen countries including the United Kingdom, the United States, and Germany.

Singles
The lead single from the album, "Lean On", a collaboration with DJ Snake and Danish singer MØ, was released on March 2, 2015. The track received universally positive reviews and became a massive hit, reaching the top ten in nineteen international charts and topping many others, giving Major Lazer their most internationally successful single to date.

The second single from the album, "Powerful", featuring Ellie Goulding and Tarrus Riley was released simultaneously with the album on June 1, 2015. A preview of the single was revealed on April 23, 2015, whilst the whole song was unveiled on May 28, 2015. The song was added to BBC Radio 1's playlist on 21 June 2015. It reached top 10 in Australia and Poland.

The remix of "Light It Up" featuring Nyla & Fuse ODG was released as the third single on the album in 5 November 2015 and became a top 10 hit in UK, Ireland, Belgium, Germany, Netherlands, Denmark, Finland, Norway and Sweden, therefore becoming one of the highest charting Major Lazer singles to date.

Promotional singles and other songs

Four promotional singles were released; "Roll the Bass" on March 23, 2015, "Night Riders", a collaboration with Travi$ Scott, 2 Chainz, Pusha T and Mad Cobra, released on April 20, 2015, and "Too Original", a collaboration with Elliphant and Jovi Rockwell, released on May 11, 2015. On 2 June 2015, a lyric video was released for "Be Together", a collaboration with Wild Belle, making it the fourth promotional single. On 4 June 2015, a lyric video was released for "Blaze Up the Fire", a collaboration with Chronixx, making it the fifth promotional single.

"All My Love" featuring Ariana Grande was featured on The Hunger Games: Mockingjay, Part 1 – Original Motion Picture Soundtrack prior to the remix that is featured on Peace Is the Mission.

On April 27, 2015, Diplo revealed in an interview with Belgian radio station Studio Brussel that they have been working on a track with Belgian singer Selah Sue. He added that it might appear on their next album. Selah Sue herself confirmed this during an interview with Studio Brussels on May 4, 2015. In May 2015, Major Lazer revealed their fourth album would be called Music Is the Weapon.

Commercial performance
The album debuted at number 12 on the Billboard 200, selling 16,000 copies. It also debuted at number five on the Canadian Albums Chart with 3,500 copies sold.  In its second week of sales, the album dropped to number 26 on the US chart, selling 4,000 copies, bringing total sales to 20,000 copies. In its third week of sales, the album dropped to number 34 on the chart, selling 3,000 copies, bringing the total sales to 23,000 copies. In its first month of sales, the album rose up to number 24 on the chart, selling 3,000 copies, bringing the total sales to 26,000 copies. In its fifth week of sales, the album dropped to number 30 on the chart, selling 2,000 copies, bringing total sales to 28,000 copies.  In its sixth week of sales, its total sales increased to 32,000 copies. In its seventh week of sales, the total sales increased to 35,000 copies.  In its second month of sales, the total sales increased to 37,000 copies.

In its fourth week of sales, the album rose to the number 1 spot on the US Dance/Electronic albums chart.

Track listing

Notes
  signifies an additional producer.
 "Roll the Bass" contains uncredited vocals performed by Taranchyla (Ashanti Reid) and Randy Valentine (Ronald Fritz Jr).
 "Thunder & Lightning" contains samples of the 1989 song "Brimstone & Fire" by Clifton Gibbs and the Selected Few.
 "Lost" is a cover of the Frank Ocean song of the same name.

Personnel 
Credits for Peace Is the Mission adapted from AllMusic.

 Dark Art – mixing
 Boaz van de Beatz – instrumentation, mixing, producer, programming
 Jr. Blender – additional production, instrumentation, mixing, producer, programming
 2 Chainz – vocals 
 Chronixx – vocals ;
 Mad Cobra – vocals 
 Rich Costey – mixing
 Diplo – instrumentation, producer, programming
 Elliphant – vocals 
 Ellie Goulding – engineer, vocals 
 Ariana Grande – vocals 
 Tom Hough – vocal engineer
 JSTJR – programming
 Manny Marroquin – mixing
 Philip Meckseper – engineer
 Machel Montano – vocals 
 Sonny Moore – additional production, guitar, programming
 MØ – vocals 
 Nyla – vocals 
 Picard Brothers – guitar, producer, programming
 Ricky Remedy – instrumentation, mixing
 Tarrus Riley – engineer, vocals 
 Todd Robinson – mixing assistant
 Jovi Rockwell – vocals 
 Anthony Rotella – mixing
 James Royo – mixing
 Travi$ Scott – vocals 
 DJ Snake – producer
 Andrew Swanson – producer, programming
 Pusha T – vocals 
 David Taylor – additional production, mixing
 Ticklah – instrumentation
 Walshy Fire – vocals
 Wild Belle – vocals , instrumentation
 Wiwek – additional production, programming

Charts and certifications

Weekly charts

Year-end charts

Certifications

References

Moombahton
Moombahton albums
2015 albums
Major Lazer albums
Albums produced by Diplo
Mad Decent albums